Xenogenesis is a 1978 Canadian-American science fiction short film directed by James Cameron. It stars William Wisher Jr. and Margaret Umbel.

Plot
Raj (an engineered man, trained to deliver humanity from the final cataclysm) and Laurie (a woman raised by a machine, but she alone knew the power of love) are sent in a gigantic sentient starship to search space for a place to start a new life cycle. Having come across a derelict starship, belonging to an unknown people said to have been dead for fifty thousand years, Raj decides to take a look around. He comes across a gigantic robotic cleaner, which attacks Raj and he ends up hanging from an edge. Laurie arrives to help, driving a vehicle with four legs. Raj instructs her to get back to their ship, but she refuses and engages the robot in combat. Laurie pushes the robot towards the edge, with the robot fighting to not go over it.

Cast
 William Wisher Jr. as Raj
 Margaret Umbel as Laurie

Production

Cameron raised $20,000 from a local dentist to fund the movie. Most of the film was shot in his living room and the methods he used were self taught. Learning as they went, Cameron said he felt like a doctor doing his first surgical procedure.

It was noted in A Critical Companion to James Cameron that the scene from Aliens where Ripley yells at the Queen Alien was similar to a scene in this movie. It was also noted that many of the themes that would appear in later Cameron movies, included a strong female character, can be first found here.

The dentist pulled out of the project based on the screened demo, but Roger Corman was sufficiently impressed to hire Cameron to work on Battle Beyond the Stars and Piranha II.

Home media
The film is available on YouTube.

References

External links

1978 films
American science fiction short films
Canadian science fiction short films
Films directed by James Cameron
1970s science fiction films
Films with screenplays by James Cameron
American robot films
Films about artificial intelligence
Films scored by Bernard Herrmann
1970s English-language films
1970s American films
1970s Canadian films